The Lyutoga is a river on Sakhalin island, third by size within the island. It flows through Kholmsk and Aniva districts of Sakhalin Oblast. Starting at the western slope of the Mitsulsky Mountain Ridge, which belongs to the system of Western Sakhalin Mountains. It flows along a wide valley from North to South, and discharges into the Aniva Bay of the Sea of Okhotsk. There is a town of Aniva (with population of ca. 8,100 people) in the mouth of the river, the town used to have the same name as the river before 1905. There are several comparatively large villages located on Lyutoga banks (upstream to downstream):  Pyatirechie (ca. 600), Chaplanovo (ca. 900), Ogon'ki (ca. 400) and Petropavlovskoye (ca. 400).  

The river is fed mainly by melting snow. Average inclination is 0,37%, average discharge (near Ogon'ki Village) — 31,7 m³/s, average annual flow being about 1 km³. The width near the mouth is 145 m. The highest level of the river is usually observed in the end of April, the lowest - in the middle of September. From the beginning of December till middle of April the river is covered by ice.

The largest tributaries (in brackets - length, km): right — Bystraya (Podgornaya) (42), Chipian (21), Kamenka (18),  Okulovka (17); left — Tiobut (52), Bezymyanka (21), Chernozyomka (16), Naryan-Mar (16).

References

Rivers of Sakhalin Oblast
Drainage basins of the Sea of Okhotsk